The Blacklist is a 1916 American silent drama film directed by William C. deMille and written by Marion Fairfax and William C. deMille. The film stars Blanche Sweet, Charles Clary, Ernest Joy, William Elmer, Horace B. Carpenter, and Lucien Littlefield. The film was released on February 20, 1916, by Paramount Pictures.

Plot

Colorado miners strike, this forces, Warren Harcourt,  the coal company manager to come to the scene. This causes a chain of events that will change the current status quo.

Cast 
Blanche Sweet as Vera Maroff
Charles Clary as Warren Harcourt
Ernest Joy as Mark Norton
William Elmer as King 
Horace B. Carpenter as Sergius Maroff
Lucien Littlefield as Frederick Holtz
Jane Wolfe as Mary

See also
 Colorado Coalfield War

References

External links

1916 films
1910s English-language films
Silent American drama films
1916 drama films
Paramount Pictures films
Films directed by William C. deMille
American black-and-white films
American silent feature films
1910s American films